Arjhovit is a village in the Lori Province of Armenia. In 1988-1989 Armenian refugees from Azerbaijan settled in the village.

References

External links 
 (as Ghursali)

Populated places in Lori Province